Khao Lampi–Hat Thai Mueang National Park is a national park in Phang Nga Province, Thailand. The park is named for its two separate sections: Khao Lampi named for the park section containing Lampi mountain range and Hat Thai Mueang, the beach section of the park.

Geography
The park lies just off Route 4 (Phetkasem Road).

History
Previously known as Lampi Waterfall and Lampi Forest Park, Khao Lampi–Hat Thai Mueang became Thailand's 52nd national park on 14 April 1986.

Attractions
The park is best known for its large waterfalls located in the mountainous eastern section. The park's namesake waterfall, Lampi, is of similar height but lesser volume and falls in numerous tiers.

The Hat Thai Mueang section consists of a pristine  white sand Andaman Sea beach backed by a mangrove forest. A distinguishing feature of the beach (and a prime reason for its protected status) is that it is a sea turtle nesting area. Between November and February sea turtles come to this stretch of beach to lay eggs. In March, a local festival marks when many of the newly hatched baby turtles make their way to the sea.

Flora and fauna
The park's eastern section is covered in tropical rainforest, including such tree species as Dipterocarpus, Anisoptera costata, Hopea odorata and bullet wood. Bamboo and rattan are found at lower levels.

In the park's beach section, mangrove forests are found along brackish canals which feed from higher ground into the sea. The mangroves play a protective ecological role in numerous respects including filtration of water from higher ground and providing a sea life nursery. Additionally, the wave energy of the 2004 tsunami was dissipated somewhat by the mangroves in this area.

Further back from the seafront, beach forest is found including such species as Casuarina equisetifolia, Terminalia catappa, Derris indica and Barringtonia. Swamp forest is also present in this area and is one of the few areas on the Andaman sea coast featuring such an ecosystem.

Mammals in the park include Sumatran serow, Malayan tapir, lar gibbon and Malayan sun bear. Turtle species include leatherback, green and hawksbill. Pythons and Malayan pit vipers are also present.

Leatherback sea turtles swim seasonally to lay eggs on Thai Mueang Beach in the park. Thailand was once a sanctuary for leatherback turtles. Monitoring between 2003–2013 at Thai Mueang Beach found turtles laid 2,678 eggs there and 1,574, or 58.7 percent survived. The species is disappearing. Irresponsible trawler fishing is one of the factors to blame. Property development on the beach has kept the turtles away. Another factor is the traditional belief that consuming turtle eggs boost one's sexual prowess. There have been reports of villagers selling leatherback eggs for up to 150 baht each.

Freshwater fish include rare species such as non-local Nile tilapia, saltwater eel and Hemibagrus wyckii species of catfish. Less rare species such as Nieuhof's walking catfish and blue panchax are also found here.

Khao Lampi–Hat Thai Mueang is home to at least 188 bird species, including black-thighed falconet, oriental honey-buzzard, red junglefowl and thick-billed pigeon.

See also
List of national parks of Thailand
List of Protected Areas Regional Offices of Thailand

References

External links

National parks of Thailand
Geography of Phang Nga province
Tourist attractions in Phang Nga province
1986 establishments in Thailand
Protected areas established in 1986